Røldalsvatnet is a lake in Ullensvang Municipality in Vestland county, Norway. The village of Røldal is located at the northern tip of the lake and the village of Botnen is located at the southern end. The European route E134 highway runs along the northern end of the lake, and the Norwegian National Road 13 runs along the western shore of the lake.

See also
List of lakes in Norway

References

Lakes of Vestland
Ullensvang